This is a continued list of games for the Sony PlayStation video game system, organized alphabetically by name. There are often different names for the same game in different regions.

Games list (M–Z)

There are currently  games across both this page (M to Z) and the remainder of the list from A to L.

For a chronological list, click the sort button in any of the available region's column. Games dated December 3, 1994 (JP), September 9, 1995 (NA), September 29, 1995 (EU), and November 15, 1995 (AU) are launch titles of each region respectively.

Applications List (M-Z)

Bundles List (M-Z)

Notes

See also
 List of PlayStation games (A–L)

References

1
 
PlayStation (M-Z)